Marcus Jerome Sasser Jr. (born September 21, 2000) is an American college basketball player for the Houston Cougars of the American Athletic Conference (AAC).

High school career
Sasser played basketball for Red Oak High School in Red Oak, Texas under the coaching of his uncle, Jason. As a senior, he was named District 14-5A most valuable player and Class 5A All-State. Sasser committed to playing college basketball for Houston over offers from Colorado State, SMU and UTEP.

College career
After struggling at first, Sasser joined Houston's starting lineup in the second half of his freshman season. On February 15, 2020, he scored a season-high 26 points in a 73–72 overtime loss to SMU. As a freshman, Sasser averaged 8.1 points and shot 35.2 percent from three-point range. He was named to the American Athletic Conference (AAC) All-Freshman Team. In his sophomore season debut on November 25, Sasser scored 25 points, making seven three-pointers, in an 89–45 victory over Lamar. On January 9, 2021, he scored 28 points with eight three-pointers in a 71–50 win over Tulane. As a sophomore, Sasser averaged 13.7 points and 2.6 rebounds per game, helping Houston reach the Final Four of the NCAA Tournament. He was named to the Second Team All-AAC. On December 24, 2021, Sasser announced that an injury to his toe would end his 2021–22 season. At the time, he led Houston with 17.7 points per game.

Career statistics

College

|-
| style="text-align:left;"| 2019–20
| style="text-align:left;"| Houston
| 30 || 17 || 23.8 || .363 || .352 || .758 || 2.4 || 1.7 || .6 || .1 || 8.1
|-
| style="text-align:left;"| 2020–21
| style="text-align:left;"| Houston
| 29 || 28 || 31.9 || .380 || .335 || .852 || 2.6 || 2.2 || 1.4 || .0 || 13.7
|-
| style="text-align:left;"| 2021–22
| style="text-align:left;"| Houston
| 12 || 12 || 32.0 || .437 || .437 || .744 || 2.8 || 2.6 || 2.2 || .1 || 17.7
|- class="sortbottom"
| style="text-align:center;" colspan="2"| Career
| 71 || 57 || 28.5 || .387 || .361 || .797 || 2.6 || 2.1 || 1.2 || .1 || 12.0

Personal life
His father, Marcus Sr., played basketball for Frank Phillips College. His uncles, Jeryl and Jason, were All-American college players and played in the National Basketball Association (NBA).

References

External links
Houston Cougars bio

2000 births
Living people
All-American college men's basketball players
American men's basketball players
Basketball players from Dallas
Houston Cougars men's basketball players
Shooting guards